This was the first edition of the tournament, primarily created due to the one-week delay of the 2021 French Open.

Novak Djokovic won the title, defeating Alex Molčan in the final, 6–4, 6–3. It was Djokovic's third title ever in a tournament held in Serbia (excluding the Davis Cup).

Seeds
The top four seeds receive a bye into the second round.

Draw

Finals

Top half

Bottom half

Qualifying

Seeds

Qualifiers

Lucky losers

Qualifying draw

First qualifier

Second qualifier

Third qualifier

Fourth qualifier

References

External links
Main draw
Qualifying draw

2021 ATP Tour